Rafał is the Polish form of the male given name Raphael.

Rafał may refer to:

Rafał Śliż (born 1983), Polish ski jumper
Rafał A. Ziemkiewicz (born 1964), Polish fiction author and journalist
Rafał Andraszak (born 1978), Polish footballer
Rafał Augustyn (composer) (born 1951), composer of classical music, pianist, music critic, writer and scholar of Polish philology
Rafał Augustyn (racewalker) (born 1984), Polish race walker
Rafał Berliński (born 1976), Polish footballer
Rafał Blechacz (born 1985), Polish classical pianist
Rafał Boguski (born 1984), Polish footballer
Rafał Bruski (born 1962), Polish politician, president of Bydgoszcz (2010)
Rafał Brzozowski (born 1981), Polish singer and TV presenter, represented Poland in the Eurovision Song Contest 2021
Rafał Dębski (born 1969), Polish writer of fantasy, historic, sensational and criminal novels
Rafał de Weryha-Wysoczański, Ph.D., (born 1975), Polish art historian, genealogist and writer
Rafał Dobrowolski (born 1983), athlete from Poland, who competes in archery
Rafał Dobrucki (born 1976), Polish speedway rider who was a permanent rider in 2000 Speedway Grand Prix
Rafał Dutkiewicz (born 1959), the current mayor of the city of Wrocław, Poland (since 2002)
Rafał Fedaczyński (born 1980), Polish race walker
Rafał Feinmesser (1895–?), Polish chess master
Rafał Gan-Ganowicz (1932–2002), a Polish mercenary, journalist, and activist
Rafał Głażewski (born 1980), Polish sprint canoeist who competed in the early to mid-2000s
Rafał Gikiewicz (born 1987), Polish footballer
Rafał Grodzicki (born 1983), Polish defender
Rafał Grotowski (born 1973), field hockey player from Poland
Rafał Grupiński (born 1952), Polish politician
Rafał Grzelak (born 1982), Polish footballer
Rafał Grzelak (born 1988) (born 1988), Polish footballer
Rafał Grzyb (born 1983), Polish footballer (midfielder)
Rafał Hadziewicz (1803–1883), Polish historical painter
Rafał Jackiewicz (born 1977), Polish professional boxer who fights in welterweight division
Rafał Jakubowicz (born 1974), visual artist
Rafał Janicki (born 1992), Polish footballer
Rafał Jaworski (born 1973), Polish historian and archivist
Rafał Jewtuch (born 1973), internationally notable Polish amateur snooker player
Rafał Kaczmarczyk (born 1972), retired Polish professional footballer
Rafał Kaczor (born 1982), Polish amateur boxer, represented Poland at flyweight at the 2008 Olympics
Rafał Kosik (born 1971), Polish science fiction writer
Rafał Kosznik (born 1983), Polish footballer
Rafał Kownacki (born 1980), Polish lawyer
Rafał Kozielewski (born 1976), Polish judoka
Rafał Kubacki (born 1967), Polish judoka
Rafał Kujawa (born 1988), Polish footballer
Rafał Kurmański (1982–2004), Polish speedway rider
Rafał Kwieciński (born 1975), Polish footballer
Rafał Lasocki (born 1975), Polish professional footballer
Rafał Leszczyński (1526–1592) (1526–1592), voivode of the Brześć Kujawski Voivodeship from 1545 to 1550
Rafał Leszczyński (1579–1636) (1579–1636), Polish-Lithuanian noble and Imperial count
Rafał Leszczyński (1650–1703) (1650–1703), Polish nobleman (szlachcic), father of King of Poland Stanisław I Leszczyński
Rafał Leszczyński (footballer) (born 1992), Polish goalkeeper
Rafał Muchacki (born 1955), Polish politician
Rafał Murawski (born 1981), Polish footballer (midfielder)
Rafał Niżnik (born 1974), Polish footballer
Rafał of Tarnów, Polish nobleman (szlachcic)
Rafał Okoniewski (born 1980), Polish speedway rider
Rafał Olbiński (born 1943), painter, illustrator and designer living in the USA
Rafał Pankowski (born 1976), Polish sociologist and political scientist
Rafał Patyra (born 1974), Polish sport journalist who has worked in Telewizja Polska since 2003
Rafał Pietrzak (born 1992), Polish footballer
Rafał Piotrowski (born 1985), Polish death metal vocalist
Rafał Piszcz (born 1940), Polish sprint canoeist
Rafał Ratajczyk (born 1983), Polish professional racing cyclist
Rafał Siemaszko (born 1986), Polish footballer
Rafał Stradomski (born 1958), Polish composer of contemporary classical music, pianist, and writer
Rafał Syska (born 1974), Polish film historian and writer
Rafał Szombierski (born 1982), Polish speedway rider
Rafał Szukała (born 1971), former butterfly swimmer from Poland, Olympic silver medallist
Rafał Szwed (born 1973), Polish professional footballer
Rafał Taubenschlag (1881–1958), Polish historian of law, a specialist in Roman law and papyrology
Rafał Ulatowski (born 1973), Polish football manager
Rafał Wójcik (born 1972), Polish long-distance runner
Rafał Wiechecki (born 1978), Polish politician
Rafał Wieruszewski (born 1981), Polish sprinter, specializes in the 400 metres
Rafał Wnuk (born 1967), Polish historian
Rafał Wojaczek (1945–1971), Polish poet of the postwar generation
Rafał Wolski (born 1992), Polish professional footballer

See also
Rafal (disambiguation)

Polish masculine given names